The Olisthaerinae  are a subfamily of the Staphylinidae. They are similar to the Phloeocharinae. Their habitat is under the bark of dead conifers. Their biology is poorly known. The tarsal formula is 5-5-5. In North America, two species, Olisthaerus megacephalus (Zetterstedt) and O. substriatus (Gyllenhal) are known, from  Alaska across Canada to New York.

References

External links

Olisthaerinae at Bugguide.net. 

Staphylinidae